Road 94 is a road in southern Iran connecting Bushehr Province to Firouzabad, Lar and Bandarabbas.

References

External links 

 Iran road map on Young Journalists Club

Roads in Iran